Sudan competed at the 2016 Summer Olympics in Rio de Janeiro, Brazil, from 5 to 21 August 2016. This was the nation's eleventh appearance at the Summer Olympics.

The Sudan Olympic Committee selected a squad of six athletes, four men and two women, to compete in athletics, swimming, and judo, matching the nation's roster size with London 2012. All of the athletes made their Olympic debut in Rio de Janeiro, except for middle-distance runner Amina Bakhit (women's 800 m), the lone returning Olympian. Meanwhile, steeplechaser Abdalla Targan led the Sudanese delegation as the nation's team captain and flag bearer in the opening ceremony.

Sudan, however, left Rio de Janeiro without receiving a single Olympic medal, failing to replicate its performance from the 2008 Summer Olympics in Beijing, where Ismail Ahmed Ismail earned a silver in the men's 800 metres, which marked the last time the country had won a medal at the Summer Olympics.

Athletics (track and field)
 
Sudanese athletes achieved qualifying standards in the following athletics events (up to a maximum of 3 athletes in each event):

Track & road events

Judo
 
Sudan received an invitation from the Tripartite Commission to send a judoka competing in the men's middleweight category (90 kg) to the Olympics, signifying the nation's return to the sport for the first time since 1992.

Swimming

Sudan received Universality invitations from FINA to send two swimmers (one male and one female).

References

External links 
 

Nations at the 2016 Summer Olympics
2016
Olympics